Miguel Algarín Jr. (11 September 1941 – 30 November 2020) was a Puerto Rican poet, writer, co-founder of the Nuyorican Poets Café, and a Rutgers University professor of English.

Early years 
Algarín was born in Santurce, Puerto Rico, and was educated and raised in a culturally-minded household.  The love for all things involving culture always prevailed in his family.  His family and he migrated to the Lower East Side of Manhattan in New York City in 1950. While there he received both his primary and secondary education. Algarín went on to study English at the University of Wisconsin (B.A., 1963) and Pennsylvania State University (M.A., 1965). He then received his PhD in comparative literature at Rutgers University. Teaching English at Brooklyn College and New York University, he developed a love and understanding of the works of Shakespeare.  Shakespeare's antique tales were the force which motivated Algarín to strive to one day have a place of his own where he could tell the story of where he lives.  Eventually, Algarín became a professor of Shakespeare, creative writing, and United States ethnic literature at Rutgers University.

In 1973, Algarín was using the living room of his apartment in Manhattan as a gathering place for poets and artists.  By 1975, there were so many poets and artists gathering and reciting their works in the apartment, that Algarín decided to look for a more comfortable location.

Nuyorican Poets Café
Algarín, Miguel Piñero, Pedro Pietri, and other poets rented a location on East 6th street and named it the Nuyorican Poets Café.  In 1980, Algarín purchased a building on East 3rd street to expand the café.  The Café is now a non-profit organization that offers programs which include poetry and prose readings, theatrical and musical performances, and visual arts exhibits. It is one of the key cultural institutions of the Nuyorican Movement. The Nuyorican Poets Cafe popularized slam poetry.

The theater has won over 30 "AUDELCO Awards" and was honored with an Obie grant for excellence in theater.  Of the screenplays read in the theater, 40 have been turned into films.  The Latin jam session which is celebrated at the Café has been a weekly "Critics Choice" at the New York Press for six consecutive years. The Café also has a radio broadcast on WBAI, where Algarín started the broadcast with his signature "We're live from the Nuyorican Poets Café".

Algarín played an important role in the spread of Nuyorican literature by compiling, with Miguel Piñero, its first anthology Nuyorican Poetry: An Anthology of Puerto Rican Words and Feelings.  He also founded a publishing house called the Nuyorican Press, which only published one book, his own Mongo Affair. He also helped launch Arte Public Press, which became a leading publishing house for Nuyorican works.

Principally known as a poet, Algarín's books include Mongo Affair, On Call (1980), Body Bee Calling from the 21st Century (1982), Time's Now/Ya es tiempo (1985), and Love Is Hard Work: Memorias de Loisaida/Poems (1997, Lower East Side Memories/Poems). He also published anthologies of works that were performed at the Nuyorican Poets Café, including Aloud: Voices from the Nuyorican Poets Café (1994) which he co-edited with Bob Holman. He was the editor of Action: The Nuyorican Café Theatre Festival and co-editor of Aloud.  Among his award-winning poetry books are Time's Now/Ya Es Tiempo and Love is Hard Work.

Honors
Algarín held the status of Professor Emeritus for his more than 30 years of service to Rutgers University.  He has received three American Book Awards and the Larry Leon Hamlin Producer's Award at the 2001 National Black Festival. In the movie Piñero, about the life of Miguel Piñero, directed by Leon Ichaso and starring Benjamin Bratt, Algarín is portrayed by the actor Giancarlo Esposito. Algarín received three American Book Awards and became the first Latino to win the Before Columbus Lifetime Achievement American Book Award in 2009.

Later years
Algarín retired as professor from Rutgers University, but continued as the executive producer of the Nuyorican Poets Café's theater and was working on a piece of literature titled "Dirty Beauty". In 2001, he was portrayed by actor Giancarlo Esposito in the Miguel Piñero biopic Piñero.

Death
Algarín died from sepsis at a hospital in Manhattan on 30 November 2020, at age 79.

Works
 

Action. Touchstone. 1997. 
Survival Supervivencia. Arte Publico Press. 2009.

Editor

See also

List of Latin American writers
List of Puerto Rican writers
List of Puerto Ricans
Puerto Rican literature
Multi-Ethnic Literature of the United States
Before Columbus Foundation
Miguel Piñero, co-founder of Nuyorican Poetry movement
Giannina Braschi, author of Spanglish novel, Yo-Yo Boing!
Pedro Pietri, co-founder of Nuyorican Poets Café

References

External links
Miguel Algarin Web Site  
Nuyorican Poets Café
View Current TV's program on Nuyorican Power
View list of past American Book Award winners
"A Nuyorican Who Made Himself An East Village Legend", The New York Sun, LAN NGUYEN
Manuscript materials of Miguel Algarín´s literary work are held at Centro. Center for Puerto Rican Studies, Hunter, CUNY.

1941 births
2020 deaths
20th-century Puerto Rican poets
21st-century Puerto Rican poets
American Book Award winners
Brooklyn College faculty
Deaths from sepsis
Infectious disease deaths in New York (state)
People from the Lower East Side
People from Santurce, Puerto Rico
Pennsylvania State University alumni
Puerto Rican male writers
Rutgers University alumni
Rutgers University faculty
Writers from Manhattan
University of Wisconsin–Madison College of Letters and Science alumni